Amni International Petroleum Development Company Limited is a Nigerian independent oil and gas exploration and production company founded in 1993 which engages exploration and production of oil and gas. The company operates two oil producing offshore blocks in Nigeria.

In March 2014, it extended to Ghana with plans to drill on its deep-water Central Tano block.

References

External links 

 

Oil and gas companies of Nigeria
Companies based in Lagos
Energy companies established in 1993
Non-renewable resource companies established in 1993
Nigerian companies established in 1993